Wipawee Srithong (born ) is a Thai volleyball player. She is part of the Thailand women's national volleyball team. On club level she played for Supreme Chonburi.

Club 
  Supreme Chonburi (2014 –)
  Vietinbank VC (2019 – 2020)
  Ninh Bình LVPB (2023)

Awards

Individuals
 2016 Asean Junior Championship – "Best Outside Spiker"

Clubs 
 2015–16 Thailand League –  Runner-up, with Supreme Chonburi
 2016–17 Thailand League –  Champion, with Supreme Chonburi
 2017 Thai–Denmark Super League –  Champion, with Supreme Chonburi
 2017–18 Thailand League –  Champion, with Supreme Chonburi
 2018 Thai–Denmark Super League –  Champion, with Supreme Chonburi
 2018–19 Thailand League –  Runner-up, with Supreme Chonburi
 2019 Thai–Denmark Super League –  Champion, with Supreme Chonburi
 2018 Asian Club Championship –  Champion, with Supreme Chonburi
 2019 Asian Club Championship –  Runner-up, with Supreme Chonburi
 2020 Thailand League –  Champion, with Supreme Chonburi

References

1999 births
Living people
Wipawee Srithong
Wipawee Srithong
Southeast Asian Games medalists in volleyball
Wipawee Srithong
Wipawee Srithong
Competitors at the 2017 Southeast Asian Games
Competitors at the 2021 Southeast Asian Games
Outside hitters
Wipawee Srithong
Wipawee Srithong